Robert Godlonton Bisseker (19 November 1878 – 9 March 1965) was a South African-born English first-class cricketer and clergyman.

The son of Henry Bisseker, he was born at Port Elizabeth in South Africa. He was educated in England at King Edward's School in Birmingham, before matriculating to Jesus College, Cambridge. While studying at Cambridge, he made a single appearance in first-class cricket for Cambridge University Cricket Club against Warwickshire at Edgbaston in 1904. He batted once in the match, scoring an unbeaten nine runs in the Cambridge first innings of 332. With the ball, he took the wickets of Fred Moorhouse in Warwickshire's first innings and Alfred Glover in the their second innings, to finish with match figures of 2 for 44. In addition to playing cricket at Cambridge, he also played football for Cambridge University A.F.C., for which he gained a blue.

Bisseker was later ordained into the Church of England as a deacon at Peterborough Cathedral in 1912, before being appointed curate at Oakham until 1916. From there he was appointed rector at Whitwell, and later at Normanton; he held both roles simultaneously until his retirement in 1945. In retirement he lived at Felpham near Bognor Regis. Bisseker died at Hindhead in March 1965.

References

External links

1878 births
1965 deaths
People from Port Elizabeth
South African emigrants to the United Kingdom
People educated at King Edward's School, Birmingham
Alumni of Jesus College, Cambridge
English cricketers
Cambridge University cricketers
Cambridge University A.F.C. players
20th-century English Anglican priests
Association footballers not categorized by position
Association football players not categorized by nationality
Cricketers from Port Elizabeth